Il saprofita (internationally released as The Profiteer) is a 1974 Italian drama film directed by Sergio Nasca. It marked the directorial debut of Nasca and raised some controversies due to its polemic plot and to its violence.

Cast 
 Al Cliver : Ercole 
 Valeria Moriconi : The Baroness Clotilda
 Janet Agren : Teresa
 Giancarlo Marinangeli: Parsifal
 Cinzia Bruno: Brunilde
 Leopoldo Trieste : Don Vito
 Rina Franchetti : Bigot 
 Nerina Montagnani : The servant of the Holy Man
 Clara Colosimo : Lady at the wake
 Giancarlo Badessi : Superior of the Seminary
 Carlo Monni : General Augusto Bezzi

Plot 
In a small town in Apulia , the seminarian Ercole, who failed to become a priest due to an injury that caused him to lose his speech, is hired as driver and male nurse into a rich and apparently pious family of landowners, and soon became the lover of the beautiful Baroness Clotilde.

References

External links

The Profiteer at Variety Distribution

1974 films
Italian drama films
1970s Italian films